Phacusa discoidalis is a moth of the family Zygaenidae. It was described by Charles Swinhoe in 1903. It is found in northern Vietnam.

References

Moths described in 1903
Procridinae